A  is a teknonym in Arabic names, the name of an adult derived from their oldest child.

A kunya is a component of an Arabic name, a type of epithet, in theory referring to the bearer's first-born son or daughter. By extension, it may also have hypothetical or metaphorical references, e.g. in a nom de guerre or a nickname, without literally referring to a son or a daughter. Use of a kunya implies a familiar but respectful setting.

A kunya is expressed by the use of abū (father) or umm (mother) in a genitive construction, i.e. "father of" or "mother of" as an honorific in place of or alongside given names in the Arab world and the Islamic world more generally.

Medieval Jewish names generally had stock kunyas referencing the biblical eponym and not any relative. Those named Abraham received "abu Ishaq", those named Jacob, "abu Yusuf," and so on. In some cases the word abu is construed beyond the traditional sense of "father," so a person named Isaac received "abu Ibrahim" (son of Abraham) and one named Moses received "abu Imran" (son of Amram). Also common are kunyas which reflect qualities, such as "abu al-Afiya" (the Healthy) and "abu al-Barakat" (the Blessed).

General use
Abū or Umm precedes the son's or daughter's name, in a genitive construction (ʼiḍāfa). For example, the English equivalent would be to call a man "Father of John" if his eldest son is named John. Use of the kunya normally signifies some closeness between the speaker and the person so addressed, but is more formal than use of the first name. The kunya is also frequently used with reference to politicians and other celebrities to indicate respect.

A kunya may also be a nickname expressing the attachment of an individual to a certain thing: as in Abu Bakr, "father of the camel foal", given because of this person's love for camels; or Abu Hurairah, “father of the cats”, given because of his caring for and adopting stray cats. A kunya may also be a nickname expressing a characteristic of an individual, as in Umm Kulthum “mother of the chubby face”, because the characteristic of being “kulthum” is said of someone with a chubby face.

When also using a person's own birth name, the kunya will precede the proper name. Thus: abū Māzin Maħmūd, for "Mahmud, the father of Mazen" (as, for example, for Mahmoud Abbas). In Classical Arabic, but not in any of the spoken dialects, abū can change into the forms abā and abī (accusative and genitive, respectively), depending on the position of the kunya in the sentence.

In westernizations of Arabic names the words abū and abū l- are sometimes perceived as an independent part of the full name, similar to a given name.

Men who do not yet have a child are often addressed by a made-up kunya, most often from a popular or notable figure in Muslim or Arabian history.  For example, the kunya of a man with the given name Khalid who has no male heir would be Abu Walid, because of the famous Muslim military commander Khalid ibn al-Walid. Less commonly, however, it would be the name of his father. 

The following are some examples of widely used traditional kunya in the Arab world based on a person's given name (as opposed to that of their firstborn male child, especially for those with no sons or young men who have not yet married or had children):

“Abū al-Qasim” is the Prophet Muhammad’s kunya

Nom de guerre
A special practice evolved among Arab guerrillas and clandestine operators, is to use real or fictional kunyas as noms de guerre.

Examples of this include the  ISIS leader Abu Bakr (Ibrahim Awad Ibrahim al-Badri). Osama bin Laden's kunya was "Abu Abdullah".

See also

Teknonymy

References

Arabic honorifics
Arabic words and phrases
 Kunya